Edward Paul Fletcher (born January 14, 1967) is an American former professional baseball pitcher, who played in Major League Baseball (MLB) for the Philadelphia Phillies and Oakland Athletics.

, he works as a Community Relations Manager for Retreat Behavioral Health, but previously was a Business Development Representative for The Treatment Center of the Palm Beaches, in Palm Beach, Florida.

Amateur career
Paul Fletcher attended Ravenswood High School in Ravenswood, West Virginia, where he was an all-state athlete in baseball and football and a second team all-star in basketball. He played baseball for the USC Aiken Pacers for the 1986 and 1987 seasons.

References

External links

Major League Baseball pitchers
Philadelphia Phillies players
Oakland Athletics players
Baseball players from Ohio
USC Aiken Pacers baseball players
West Virginia State Yellow Jackets baseball players
1967 births
Living people